is a 2017 role-playing videogame developed by Crim for the PlayStation 4, PlayStation Vita and Nintendo Switch. Set in modern-day Tokyo, The Lost Child is a follow-up to 2011's El Shaddai: Ascension of the Metatron.

Development
In May 2013, it was announced that Sawaki Takeyasu, creator, director and lead artist of El Shaddai: Ascension of the Metatron, had purchased the rights to the El Shaddai IP from UTV Ignition Games with the intention of expanding it under his newly-formed development studio Crim. In 2017 at a Tokyo Sandbox presentation, Takeyasu teased a "major announcement" relating to the IP to be made within the next two weeks, which was officially revealed ten days later in Famitsu as The Lost Child, a role-playing game for the PlayStation 4 and PlayStation Vita set in the El Shaddai universe.

It was announced in August 2017 that Sony Interactive Entertainment would be publishing and providing localisation of the game in Chinese territories. In September 2017, it was announced by NIS America that the game would be receiving a Western release, with a Nintendo Switch port also being announced for the West in February 2018.

Reception 
The Lost Child received "mixed or average" reviews according to review aggregator Metacritic.

Notes

References

2017 video games
Cthulhu Mythos video games
Fantasy video games
First-person party-based dungeon crawler video games
Kadokawa Shoten games
Nintendo Switch games
Nippon Ichi Software games
PlayStation 4 games
PlayStation 4 Pro enhanced games
PlayStation Vita games
Role-playing video games
Video games about angels
Video games based on multiple mythologies
Video games developed in Japan
Video games set in Tokyo
Single-player video games